Andrew Jensen (June 2, 1852September 30, 1936) was a Danish American immigrant, farmer, and Republican politician.  He was a member of the Wisconsin State Assembly, representing southern Waupaca County in the 1897, 1899, and 1901 sessions.

Biography
Andrew Jensen was born in Copenhagen, Denmark, in June 1852.  He was raised and educated there and emigrated to the United States with his parents in 1867, locating at Ogdensburg, Wisconsin.

He went to work in the lumber business in 1871 and, in 1884, used his earnings to purchase a farm in the town of Helvetia, Wisconsin, in Waupaca County.

He was active with the Republican Party of Wisconsin, and was elected to the town board and school board.  In 1896, he was elected to the Wisconsin State Assembly, running on the Republican ticket.  He represented Waupaca County's 2nd Assembly district, which then comprised most of the southern half of the county.  He was subsequently re-elected in 1898 and 1900, serving in the 43rd, 44th, and 45th sessions of the legislature.

While serving in the Legislature, he moved into the city of New London, Wisconsin, which was his primary residence for many years.

Later, he moved west to Bismarck, North Dakota, where he died in 1936.  He was survived by one daughter.

Electoral history

Wisconsin Assembly (1896, 1898, 1900)

| colspan="6" style="text-align:center;background-color: #e9e9e9;"| General Election, November 3, 1896 

 

| colspan="6" style="text-align:center;background-color: #e9e9e9;"| General Election, November 8, 1898 

 

| colspan="6" style="text-align:center;background-color: #e9e9e9;"| General Election, November 6, 1900

References

1852 births
1936 deaths
Danish emigrants to the United States
Politicians from Copenhagen
People from New London, Wisconsin
Republican Party members of the Wisconsin State Assembly